is a railway station in the city of Nikkō, Tochigi, Japan, operated by the Yagan Railway.

Lines
Yunishikawa-Onsen Station is served by the Yagan Railway Aizu Kinugawa Line and is located 10.3 rail kilometers from the end of the line at Shin-Fujiwara Station.

Station layout
The station consists of a single side platform serving traffic in both directions, which is located in a tunnel

Adjacent stations

History
Yunishikawa-Onsen Station opened on October 9, 1986.

Surrounding area
 
Yunishikawa Onsen

External links

 Yagen Railway Station information 

Railway stations in Tochigi Prefecture
Railway stations in Japan opened in 1986
Nikkō, Tochigi